Road to Roma is a making-of documentary film directed by Andres Clariond and Gabriel Nuncio, and starring Yalitza Aparicio, Odín Ayala and Eugenio Caballero. The premise revolves around the making of the film Roma (2018).

Cast
 Yalitza Aparicio
 Odín Ayala
 Eugenio Caballero
 Zarela Lizbeth
 Diego Cortina Autrey
 Andy Cortés
 Alfonso Cuarón
 Marina de Tavira
 Daniela Demesa
 Nancy García García
 Verónica García
 Marco Graf
 José Luis López Gómez
 Carlos Peralta

Release 
Road to Roma was released on February 11, 2020.

References

External links
 
 

2020 documentary films
2020 films
Mexican documentary films
Spanish-language Netflix original films